Kiessee Neu Zachun is a lake in the Ludwigslust-Parchim district in Mecklenburg-Vorpommern, Germany. At an elevation of 34.4 m, its surface area is 0.1 km².

Lakes of Mecklenburg-Western Pomerania